"In the Gloaming" is an 1877 British song composed by Annie Fortescue Harrison with lyrics taken from a poem by Meta Orred. Orred's poem (of the same title as the song) appeared in her 1874 book Poems. "Gloaming" is a regional dialect term of Scots origin denoting "twilight".

The 1877 song, a lament of romantic regret, was very popular in the United States that year, and was again popularized in America in the 1910s by a recording made by The American Quartet with Will Oakland.

Versions

The American Quartet with Will Oakland released a recorded version in 1910.
John Lovering released a recorded version in 1914.
Fats Waller recorded a version in 1938. The song was a staple of Waller's live act.
Louis Armstrong and His Hot Seven recorded the song in 1941. It was released as the B side of "Everything's Been Done Before".
Bunk Johnson (trumpet), Don Ewell (piano) and Alphonse Steele (drums) recorded a trio version of this in June 1946.
Jo Stafford and Gordon MacRae released the song on their 'Songs for Sunday Evening' album in 1950.
Bing Crosby included the song in a medley on his album 101 Gang Songs (1961)
The Story recorded a version, released on their 1993 album The Angel in the House.
The Celtic Tenors included the song on their eponymous 2002 debut album.

References

Further reading and listening
1910 recording – Discography of American Historical Recordings, s.v. "Victor matrix B-9161. In the gloaming / American Quartet ; Will Oakland."

1877 songs
American popular music
Songs based on poems